The LaPierre Barn, also known as Louis LaPierre's Horse Hotel, is a site on the National Register of Historic Places located near Scobey, Montana, United States.  It was added to the Register on April 11, 2005.

It is a large gambrel roofed barn. Its main gambrel portion was built in 1910, with additions in 1916.

References

Barns on the National Register of Historic Places in Montana
National Register of Historic Places in Daniels County, Montana
1910 establishments in Montana
Buildings and structures completed in 1910